Parivartana is a 1954 Indian Telugu-language drama film directed by T. Prakash Rao. It stars N. T. Rama Rao, Akkineni Nageswara Rao and Savitri, with music composed by T. Chalapathi Rao. The film is based on Srirama Murthy Pinisetti's novel Anna-Chellelu.

Plot 
The Zamindar of a village has no children and adopts a boy from an orphanage. The boy grows up as Ananda Rao and returns to the village after higher education. Zamindar, while dying, hands over the estate affairs to Ramayya, who gains a good reputation and prestige. He has a son Satyam and a daughter Sundaramma. Ananda Rao feels jealous of Ramayya. Chalapathi and Pitchayya add to his jealousy. He insults Ramayya and stops the donation program from running under the name of Zamindar. Satyam as unemployed joins as a bus conductor and Ramayya dies of helplessness. Ananda Rao purchases the bus and dismisses Satyam from the job. Chalapathi insults Sundaramma and angered, Satyam beats him and goes to jail. Chalapathi and Pichayya steal the adoption papers from Ananda Rao and try to dismiss him. He joins the Annadana Samajam. This brings about a change in him and he repents for the injustice done to the Ramayya family. Sundaramma recognizes the change in his mindset and starts loving him. Satyam recognizes the love affair between them, recollects the documents from Pitchayya, and provides them in court. Chalapathi and Pichayya are arrested. Finally, the movie ends on a happy note with the marriage of Ananda Rao and Sundaramma.

Cast

Music 

Music was composed by T. Chalapathi Rao. Lyrics were written by Anisetti. Music released on Audio Company.

References

External links 
 

1954 films
1950s Telugu-language films
Films scored by T. Chalapathi Rao
Films directed by T. Prakash Rao
Indian drama films
1954 drama films
Indian black-and-white films